Anomochloa is a genus of Brazilian plants in the grass family, the only genus in the tribe Anomochloeae.

The only known species is Anomochloa marantoidea, native to the State of Bahia in eastern Brazil.

References

External links 

Monotypic Poaceae genera
Endemic flora of Brazil
Grasses of Brazil
Flora of Bahia
Poaceae
Taxa named by Adolphe-Théodore Brongniart